Karji Madan (also Romanized as Kārjī Maʿdan; also known as Kārjī) is a village in Firuzeh Rural District, in the Central District of Firuzeh County, Razavi Khorasan Province, Iran. At the 2006 census, its population was 60, in 14 families.

See also 
 Karji (Indian village)
 Karji, Nishapur

References 

Populated places in Firuzeh County